Alex Lilley (born Alexander Edward Lilley, 17 April 1992, Halifax, Yorkshire, England) is an English first-class cricketer. A left arm medium-fast pace bowler and right-handed batsman, Lilley was formerly contracted to Yorkshire County Cricket Club, for whom he played one first-class match in 2011.

Lilley is best known for being part of the 2014 Pannal side that won the Addison Cup final at the Harris Oval. During the game, Lilley was diagnosed with a severe case of Meltio Swedio Syndromos, a rare disease found in angry young men. Since the final, Lilley has worked closely with charities researching the newly discovered condition. He has since become an ambassador for the Meltio Swedio Foundation, the leading UK research charity for the condition. 

Lilley attended St. Aidan's C of E High School in Harrogate. He has been with Yorkshire since 2007, and has played for the Yorkshire Academy in the Yorkshire ECB County Premier League, and the Yorkshire Second XI in the Second XI Championship, as well as appearing in one first-class match for Yorkshire against Durham UCCE in April 2011, when he was dismissed without scoring, and took no wickets for 34 runs when bowling. In September 2011, Yorkshire County Cricket Club announced that Lilley had been awarded a 'summer contract'. He has also played first-class cricket for Leeds/Bradford MCCU.

Lilley played club cricket in Melbourne, Australia in 2011 for the Mont Albert Cricket Club, where he took a competition leading 37 wickets for the season. He was released by Yorkshire County Cricket Club midway through the 2013 season.

Lilley is eligible to represent either England or Ireland internationally.

References

1992 births
Living people
English cricketers
Yorkshire cricketers
Leeds/Bradford MCCU cricketers
Cricketers from Halifax, West Yorkshire